The Lithuanian Artists' Association (Lietuvos dailininkų sąjunga) is a creative voluntary artistic organization in Lithuania, uniting professional painters and artists. It is the official association for artists in the country. The association works towards stimulating and promoting the work of unions, protecting their copyright, and preparing and participating in creative efforts such as galleries etc. From 1940-1941 it was known as the Lithuanian Artists' trade union, from 1989 again the Lithuanian Artists' Union or Association.

Presidents 
 Justinas Vienožinskis – 1935-1936
 Viktoras Vizgirda – 1936-1938
 Antanas Smetona – 1938-1940
 Antanas Žmuidzinavičius – 1940
 Mečislovas Bulaka, Stepas Žukas –1940-1941
 Adalbertas Staneika – 1942-1944
 Liuda Vaineikytė – 1944-1956
 Vytautas Mackevičius – 1956-1958
 Jonas Kuzminskis – 1958-1982
 Konstantinas Bogdanas – 1982-1987
 Bronius Leonavičius – 1987-1992
 Algimantas Biguzas – 1992-1994
 Gvidas Raudonius – 1994-1998
 Vaclovas Krutinis – 1998-2008
 Eugenijus Nalevaika – 2008-2012
 Edita Utarienė – from 2012

References
Universal Lithuanian Encyclopedia 2001.

Arts organizations based in Lithuania
Arts organizations established in the 1930s